Åsa-Britt Maria Torstensson (born 25 March 1958) is a Swedish politician and a member of the Centre Party. She has a university degree in social work. She was a member of the Riksdag between 1998 and 2002 representing Västra Götaland County. Torstensson was re-elected to the Riksdag in the 2006 general election. On 6 October 2006 she was selected to become Minister for Infrastructure in the Cabinet of Fredrik Reinfeldt. After the 2010 general election she left the cabinet and returned to the Riksdag.

References

External links 
 Åsa Torstensson at the Riksdag website
 Åsa Torstensson at the Centre Party website 

1958 births
21st-century Swedish women politicians
Living people
Members of the Riksdag 1998–2002
Members of the Riksdag 2002–2006
Members of the Riksdag 2006–2010
Members of the Riksdag 2010–2014
Members of the Riksdag from the Centre Party (Sweden)
Mid Sweden University alumni
Swedish Ministers for Infrastructure
Women government ministers of Sweden
Women members of the Riksdag